Brenock Grant O'Connor (born 9 April 2000) is an English actor and singer. He is best known for his portrayal of Olly in the HBO fantasy TV series Game of Thrones (2014–2016). He was part of the main casts of the British series Dickensian (2015–2016), Living the Dream (2016–2019), and, most recently, the Amazon Prime series Alex Rider (2020–present). He is also a musician under the artist name "McGovern."

Early life
Growing up, O'Connor attended the Chatsmore Catholic High School (now Saint Oscar Romeo Catholic School) in Goring and studied theatre at The Theatre Workshop Stage School in Brighton. He started performing on stage at the age of six in the Hammond Pantomimes at the Pavilion Theatre in Worthing, and won a theatre scholarship while attending.

Career
O'Connor big break was in 2014 as Olly in the HBO fantasy television series Game of Thrones. The character was introduced originally as a one episode character, to further the story between the Wildlings and the Night's Watch at Castle Black, but was kept on the show to provide more backstory surrounding the deaths of Ygritte and Jon Snow in the fourth and fifth seasons, respectively. O'Connor appeared in seventeen episodes throughout the series, with his last appearance in the sixth-season episode "Oathbreaker," when he was hanged by a resurrected Jon Snow.

Regarding his character Olly's betrayal of Jon Snow in the fifth-season episode "Mother's Mercy," O'Connor stated that he received many negative messages from fans of the show, as well as some positive messages from people regarding his performance in the role. In a subsequent interview, O'Connor stated he was content with the controversial reaction to his character, noting "It's very rare for my character to get noticed really, so I was quite happy with the reaction that I got. When you do something bad, you want a bad reaction for it."

O'Connor has also appeared in several other roles, including Peter Cratchit in the BBC One series Dickensian, which premiered in December 2015. He also starred in the 2015 British children's adventure film Young Hunters: The Beast of Bevendean. He's appeared in a music video with Noah and the Whale as well as several television commercials for Haribo, and as a lead character part in one episode of Holby City.

On stage O'Connor has performed in front of audiences on the tour of Cameron Mackintosh's Oliver!, playing the part of The Artful Dodger alongside Iain Fletcher, Neil Morrissey and Samantha Barks. In addition to acting, O'Connor is a singer and guitarist, and has posted several cover songs on YouTube.

In 2019, O'Connor was cast for the part of Conor Lawlor in the musical adaptation of Sing Street based on the 2016 movie by John Carney, who also directed Once and was adapted for the stage as a musical as well. The Sing Street musical adaptation was originally presented at New York Theatre Workshop in December 2019. It was scheduled to premiere on Broadway at the Lyceum Theatre in Spring 2020 with an Original Cast Recording already released. However, due to the COVID-19 pandemic, the production's premiere was pushed back until the end of 2021.

O’Connor auditioned for the role of Alex Rider in the 2020 television series of the same name, but was instead given the role of Tom Harris, Alex's best friend. In an interview O’Connor stated that he did not mind not playing the lead character, saying "To be involved in this in any way is a dream come true. The books are just a major influence on my childhood."

Filmography

Film

Television

Theatre 
Selected credits

Awards and nominations

References

External links
 

2000 births
Living people
21st-century English male actors
English male film actors
English male television actors
English people of Irish descent